Osanobua or Osalobua (Esan: Osenobula, Osenebra) is the name for God in the Edo language. It is also referred to asOsa, which is commonly integrated into modern Edo names, such as Esosa, which means God's goodness or gift; Eghosa, God's time; and Efosa, God's blessings or wealth. The term originally derives from the deity from the traditional Edo language, Osa, a sky deity cognate with the Yoruba term orisha. 
The epithet  Osalobua Noghodua means God Almighty. The word  encompasses a large number of divine principles - including the divine state of being merciful, timeless, goodness, justice, sublimity, and supreme. In the Edo belief system, Osalobua has the divine attributes of omnipresence, omniscience, and omnipotence. The Supreme Deity is believed to be present everywhere and at all times.

Edo State has several areas with their own local dialects; Esan, Ewohimi, Ewato, Ewosa, Etsako, Auchi, Igueben, Ora, Oredo,  Orihionmwon and Iruekpen to mention but a few. The Esan people called God "Osenebra" or "Osenobula". It is often abbreviated as Ose. God is also described as "Ofuekenede" (merciful God), "Okakaludo" (stronger than stone), "Obonosuobo" (the great physician), “Oshimiri atata” (a river that never runs dry) etc.

References

Names of God in African traditional religions